Eaton is the name of some places in the U.S. state of Wisconsin:

Eaton, Brown County, Wisconsin
Eaton, Clark County, Wisconsin
Eaton, Manitowoc County, Wisconsin